Fugitiva is a nine-part Spanish thriller-drama television series produced by RTVE and Grupo Ganga, created by Joaquín Oristrell and starring Paz Vega, Julio Bracho and Arantza Ruiz. It originally aired on La 1 in 2018.

Premise 
The plot, set in between Mexico and Spain, revolves around Magda (Paz Vega) who organizes an escape plan hidden as a kidnap to protect her children from the enemies of her husband Alejandro (Julio Bracho).

Cast
 Paz Vega as Magda 
 Julio Bracho as Alejandro 
 Arantza Ruiz as Paulina 
 Luisa Rubino as Claudia 
 Lander Otaola as Edu 
 Iván Pellicer as Ruben 
 José Manuel Poga as Tobias 
 Mercedes Sampietro as Nora 
 Melina Matthews as Isabel 
 Sebastian Montecino as Ricardo
 Matt Fowler as Velasco
 Philip Hersh as Amadeo de Juan
 Billy Kametz as Tobias
 Tara Sands as Magda

Production and release 
Produced by RTVE in collaboration with Grupo Ganga, it was filmed in Madrid and Benidorm. The series premiered on April 5, 2018 on La 1. The main theme of the series was interpreted by the singer Ana Guerra. The broadcasting run ended on 7 June 2018, averaging 1,391,000 viewers and a 8.5% share.

References

External links
 
 
 

2010s Spanish drama television series
Spanish thriller television series
2018 Spanish television series debuts
2018 Spanish television series endings
La 1 (Spanish TV channel) network series
Spanish-language Netflix original programming
Television shows set in Mexico
Television shows set in the Valencian Community
Television shows filmed in Spain
Television series by Grupo Ganga